Glutamine (symbol Gln or Q) is an α-amino acid that is used in the biosynthesis of proteins.  Its side chain is similar to that of glutamic acid, except the carboxylic acid group is replaced by an amide. It is classified as a charge-neutral, polar amino acid.  It is non-essential and conditionally essential in humans, meaning the body can usually synthesize sufficient amounts of it, but in some instances of stress, the body's demand for glutamine increases, and glutamine must be obtained from the diet. It is encoded by the codons CAA and CAG.

In human blood, glutamine is the most abundant free amino acid.

The dietary sources of glutamine include especially the protein-rich foods like beef, chicken, fish, dairy products, eggs, vegetables like beans, beets, cabbage, spinach, carrots, parsley, vegetable juices and also in wheat, papaya, Brussels sprouts, celery, kale and fermented foods like miso.

Functions 
Glutamine plays a role in a variety of biochemical functions:
 Protein synthesis, as any other of the 20 proteinogenic amino acids
 Lipid synthesis, especially by cancer cells.
 Regulation of acid-base balance in the kidney by producing ammonium
 Cellular energy, as a source, next to glucose
 Nitrogen donation for many anabolic processes, including the synthesis of purines
 Carbon donation, as a source, refilling the citric acid cycle
 Nontoxic transporter of ammonia in the blood circulation.
 Integrity of healthy intestinal mucosa, though small randomized trials have shown no benefit in Crohn’s disease.

Roles in metabolism and cancer 
Cancer cells rely on glutamine metabolism as carbon and nitrogen sources. Glutamine level in the blood serum is the highest among other amino acids and is essential for many cellular functions.

Studies have indicated the importance of glutamine in certain tumors. For example, the inhibition of glutamine metabolism was reported to prevent growth of several tumors such as breast, liver, kidney and T-cell lymphoblastic leukemia.

Precursor
Glutamine maintains redox balance by participating in glutathione synthesis and contributing to anabolic processes such as lipid synthesis by reductive carboxylation.

Glutamine also preserves nitrogen availability for synthesis of nucleotides and non-essential amino acids. One of the most important functions of glutamine is its ability to be converted into α-KG, which helps to maintain the flow of the tricarboxylic acid cycle, generating ATPs.

Production
Glutamine is produced industrially using mutants of Brevibacterium flavum, which gives ca. 40 g/L in 2 days using glucose as a carbon source.
Glutamine is synthesized by the enzyme glutamine synthetase from glutamate and ammonia. The most relevant glutamine-producing tissue is the muscle mass, accounting for about 90% of all glutamine synthesized. Glutamine is also released, in small amounts, by the lungs and brain. Although the liver is capable of relevant glutamine synthesis, its role in glutamine metabolism is more regulatory than producing, since the liver takes up large amounts of glutamine derived from the gut.

Consumers 
The most eager consumers of glutamine are the cells of intestines, the kidney cells for the acid-base balance, activated immune cells, and many cancer cells.

Uses

Nutrition 
Glutamine is the most abundant naturally occurring, nonessential amino acid in the human body, and one of the few amino acids that can directly cross the blood–brain barrier. Humans obtain glutamine through catabolism of proteins in foods they eat. In states where tissue is being built or repaired, like growth of babies, or healing from wounds or severe illness, glutamine becomes conditionally essential.

Sickle cell disease 
In 2017, the U.S. Food and Drug Administration (FDA) approved L-glutamine oral powder, marketed as Endari, to reduce severe complications of sickle cell disease in people aged five years and older with the disorder.

The safety and efficacy of L-glutamine oral powder were studied in a randomized trial of subjects ages five to 58 years old with sickle cell disease who had two or more painful crises within the 12 months prior to enrollment in the trial. Subjects were assigned randomly to treatment with L-glutamine oral powder or placebo, and the effect of treatment was evaluated over 48 weeks. Subjects who were treated with L-glutamine oral powder experienced fewer hospital visits for pain treated with a parenterally administered narcotic or ketorolac (sickle cell crises), on average, compared to subjects who received a placebo (median 3 vs. median 4), fewer hospitalizations for sickle cell pain (median 2 vs. median 3), and fewer days in the hospital (median 6.5 days vs. median 11 days).  Subjects who received L-glutamine oral powder also had fewer occurrences of acute chest syndrome (a life-threatening complication of sickle cell disease) compared with patients who received a placebo (8.6 percent vs. 23.1 percent).

Common side effects of L-glutamine oral powder include constipation, nausea, headache, abdominal pain, cough, pain in the extremities, back pain and chest pain.

L-glutamine oral powder received orphan drug designation. The FDA granted the approval of Endari to Emmaus Medical Inc.

Medical food 
Glutamine is marketed as medical food and is prescribed when a medical professional believes a person in their care needs supplementary glutamine due to metabolic demands beyond what can be met by endogenous synthesis or diet.

Safety 
Glutamine is safe in adults and in preterm infants. Although glutamine is metabolized to glutamate and ammonia, both of which have neurological effects, their concentrations are not increased much, and no adverse neurological effects were detected. The observed safe level for supplemental L-glutamine in normal healthy adults is 14 g/day.

Adverse effects of glutamine have been prescribed for people receiving home parenteral nutrition and those with liver-function abnormalities.
Although glutamine has no effect on the proliferation of tumor cells, it is still possible that glutamine supplementation may be detrimental in some cancer types.

Ceasing glutamine supplementation in people adapted to very high consumption may initiate a withdrawal effect, raising the risk of health problems such as infections or impaired integrity of the intestine.

Structure 
Glutamine can exist in either of two enantiomeric forms, L-glutamine and D-glutamine.  The L-form is found in nature.  Glutamine contains an α-amino group which is in the protonated −NH3+ form under biological conditions and a carboxylic acid group which is in the deprotonated −COO− form, known as carboxylate, under physiological conditions.

Research 

Glutamine mouthwash may be useful to prevent oral mucositis in people undergoing chemotherapy but intravenous glutamine does not appear useful to prevent mucositis in the GI tract.

Glutamine supplementation was thought to have potential to reduce complications in people who are critically ill or who have had abdominal surgery but this was based on poor quality clinical trials. Supplementation does not appear to be useful in adults or children with Crohn's disease or inflammatory bowel disease, but clinical studies as of 2016 were underpowered. Supplementation does not appear to have an effect in infants with significant problems of the stomach or intestines.

Some athletes use L-glutamine as supplement. Studies support the positive effects of the chronic oral administration of the supplement on the injury and inflammation induced by intense aerobic and exhaustive exercise, but the effects on muscle recovery from weight training are unclear.

See also 
 Isoglutamine

References

External links 
 Glutamine spectra acquired through mass spectroscopy
 

Carboxamides
Dietary supplements
Glucogenic amino acids
Proteinogenic amino acids
Medical food
Orphan drugs
Glutamate (neurotransmitter)
X